Stoiber is a German surname. Notable people with the surname include:

Edmund Stoiber (born 1941), German politician, former Minister President of the state of Bavaria 
Karin Stoiber (born 1943), former First Lady of Bavaria
Hans Stoiber (born 1918), Austrian poet

German-language surnames

de:Stoiber